Ardozyga acrocrossa is a species of moth in the family Gelechiidae. It was described by Turner in 1947. It is found in Australia, where it has been recorded from Queensland.

References

Ardozyga
Moths described in 1947
Moths of Australia